Lamoria exiguata is a species of snout moth. It is found in South Africa and Zimbabwe.

References

Tirathabini
Lepidoptera of South Africa
Lepidoptera of Zimbabwe
Moths of Sub-Saharan Africa
Moths described in 1964